Roveredo di Guà is a comune (municipality) in the Province of Verona in the Italian region Veneto, located about  west of Venice and about  southeast of Verona.

Roveredo di Guà borders the following municipalities: Cologna Veneta, Montagnana, Poiana Maggiore, and Pressana.

References

External links
 Official website

Cities and towns in Veneto